Gong Live Etc. is a live album by Gong, recorded between 1973 and 1975 and originally released in 1977. It is a set of live recordings (including some two-track "off-the-desk" material), studio out-takes and BBC session recordings spanning the years 1973 to 1975.

Track listing 
Credits to C.O.I.T. refer to Compagnie d'Opera Invisible de Thibet, an alternative collective name for Gong.

Side one
 "You Can't Kill Me" (Daevid Allen) – 6:50 – lineup A, 1973
 "Zero the Hero and the Witch's Spell" (Allen, Christian Tritsch) – 11:08 – lineup A, 1973
 "Flying Teapot" (Allen, Francis Moze) – 6:28 – lineup A, 1973

Side two
 "Dynamite / I Am Your Animal" (Gilli Smyth, Tritsch) – 5:44 – lineup A, 1973
 "6/8" (C.O.I.T.) – 3:53 – lineup A, 1973
 "Est-ce que Je Suis" (Allen) – 4:12 – lineup A, 1973
 "Ooby-Scooby Doomsday or The D-Day DJ's Got the D.D.T. Blues" (Allen) – 5:15 – lineup A, 1973 – studio, track omitted on CD edition

Side three
 "Radio Gnome Invisible" (Allen) – 7:35 – lineup B, 1974 – studio, BBC
 "Oily Way" (Allen, Didier Malherbe) – 3:20 – lineup B, 1974 – studio, BBC
 "Outer Temple" (Tim Blake, Steve Hillage) – 1:05 – lineup B, 1974 – studio, BBC
 "Inner Temple" (Allen, Malherbe) – 5:15 – lineup B, 1974 – studio, BBC
 "Where Have All the Flowers Gone?" (C.O.I.T.) – 3:07 – lineup A, 1974 – studio

Side four
 "Isle of Everywhere" (C.O.I.T.) – 10:24 – lineup C, 1975
 "Get It Inner" (C.O.I.T.) – 2:31 – lineup C, 1975
 "Master Builder" (C.O.I.T.) – 5:56 – lineup C, 1975
 "Flying Teapot (Reprise)" (Allen, Moze) – 1:55 – lineup C, 1975

Sources
Side 1:
tracks 1-2: Bataclan, Paris, France, May 1973 
track 3: Edinburgh Festival, Scotland, August 1973
Side 2: 
live tracks: Club Arc-en-ciel, Roanne, France, August 1973
studio track: Manor Studio, Oxfordshire, England, June 1973
Side 3: 
BBC tracks: BBC Studios, England, January 1974
studio track: Manor Studio, Oxfordshire, England, during You sessions, Summer 1974
Side 4: Marquee Club, England, September 1975

Personnel

Lineup A
Daevid Allen – guitar, vocals
Gilli Smyth  – space whisper
"Bloomdido" Didier Malherbe – flutes, saxes, percussion
Steve Hillage – guitar, vocals
Tim Blake – synthesizer, vocals
Mike Howlett – bass, vocals
Pierre Moerlen – drums

Lineup B
Daevid Allen – guitar, vocals
"Bloomdido" Didier Malherbe – flutes, saxes, percussion
Steve Hillage – guitar, vocals
Tim Blake – synthesizer, vocals
Mike Howlett – bass, vocals
Rob Tait – drums, percussion
Diane Stewart – vocals, percussion

Lineup C
Steve Hillage – guitar, vocals
Mike Howlett – bass guitar, vocals
Didier Malherbe – sax, flute, vocals, percussion
Miquette Giraudy – voices yonic
Patrice Lemoine – keyboards
Pierre Moerlen – drums, percussion
Mireille Bauer – percussion

References

External links

Gong (band) live albums
1977 live albums
Virgin Records live albums